Delfín Quishpe Apugllón (born December 4, 1977), artistically known as Delfin Hasta el Fin (lit: Dolphin until the end) is an Indigenous Quechua Ecuadorian singer-songwriter, celebrity, and politician, who gained famed performing a style he calls "Andean techno-folklore". His popularity largely comes from the comical nature of his music. Quishpe's song "Torres Gemelas" (Twin Towers) remains the song that has received most attention. He was the mayor of his hometown, Guamote, from May 2019 to December 2021, at which point he was sentenced by the Ecuadorian Attorney General's Office, to 5 years in prison for influence peddling and corruption.

Biography
Delfín Quishpe was born in a small town named San Antonio in Guamote, Ecuador. He is son of the merchant Anselmo Quishpe and Mercedes Apugllón.

Career 
In 2003, he recorded his second album, "El Gallito". It contained songs such as: "El Gallito Bandido", "El Delfincito", "Cuando Me Vaya", and "Cuaya Huay". A year later he created his first video, the aforementioned that was posted on Internet.
In 2006, "Torres Gemelas" (Twin Towers) was released. While the song is tragic in nature, the subject matter being Delfin losing a loved one in the terrorist attack of 9/11, the whimsical and kitschy nature of the song as well as the poor acting in the music video has made this song an internet meme.

In April 2010 Defín Quishpe released the  song "En tus Tierras Bailaré", featuring the two Peruvian "YouTube stars" Wendy Sulca and Tigresa del Oriente. The song received attention in Latin American media and rapidly got more than one million hits in a few weeks. The song was later called a "Youtube We are the World" by Calle 13 singer Residente.

Personal life 
He has a wife, Rosario Urquiza Coro, and two children: Luis Rolando (2002–2018) and Alex Delfín (born 2004).

References

External links
Official Website (Spanish)

1977 births
Living people
People from Guamote Canton
Ecuadorian people of Quechua descent
21st-century Ecuadorian male singers
Andean music
Internet memes